Grönblom is a Swedish-language surname, most commonly occurring in Finland.

Geographical distribution
As of 2014, 90.9% of all known bearers of the surname Grönblom were residents of Finland (frequency 1:36,645) and 8.5% of Sweden (1:703,340).

In Finland, the frequency of the surname was higher than national average (1:36,645) in the following regions:
 1. Satakunta (1:5,617)
 2. Southwest Finland (1:10,794)
 3. Päijänne Tavastia (1:16,245)
 4. Ostrobothnia (1:19,311)

People
 Berndt Grönblom (1885-1970), Finnish industrialist
 Edgar Grönblom (1883-1960), Finnish industrialist; brother of Berndt
 Rabbe Grönblom (born 1950), Finnish businessman

References

Swedish-language surnames